Lenert van Wyk (born 13 July 1989) is a South African former cricketer who currently plays for Boland, Free State, and Cape Cobras. He is a right-handed upper-order batsman and part-time medium-fast bowler.

References
Lenert van Wyk profile at CricketArchive

1989 births
Living people
Sportspeople from Cape Town
South African cricketers
Boland cricketers
Cape Cobras cricketers